Ruaridh Langan (born 15 June 1998) is a Scottish footballer who plays for Scottish League Two club Stranraer.

Club career
Langan came through the Greenock Morton youth academy, to rise to become the captain of the successful under-20 side and spent time on loan at Neilston.

He made his first-team debut in a Scottish League Cup tie against Edinburgh City in July 2017.

In late September 2018, Langan and team-mate Lewis Strapp joined Annan Athletic on a short-term development loan. Langan signed for Falkirk in March 2019, leaving in the summer without making a senior appearance and teaming up with his former manager at Greenock Morton, Jim Duffy at Scottish League One club Dumbarton scoring his first goal in senior football in a 3-2 victory against Peterhead in August 2019. After playing 28 times in his first season with the club, he extended his deal for another season in July 2020. Langan left the club in May 2021 and joined League Two side Stranraer.

Honours
SPFL Development League West: Winners (2) 2015-16, 2017-18

References

External links

1998 births
Annan Athletic F.C. players
Association football midfielders
Greenock Morton F.C. players
Living people
Scottish footballers
Scottish Professional Football League players
Footballers from Greenock
Dumbarton F.C. players
Stranraer F.C. players
Neilston Juniors F.C. players
Scottish Junior Football Association players